Michqavan may refer to:
 Michqavan-e Olya
 Michqavan-e Sofla